Deh Cho or Dehcho is the Dene name of the Mackenzie River in the Northwest Territories of Canada.  It can also refer to:

 Dehcho Region, Northwest Territories
 Deh Cho (electoral district), Northwest Territories
 Deh Cho Bridge, which spans the Mackenzie River
 Dehcho First Nations, a political grouping of indigenous peoples in the Northwest Territories
 Slavey, the main Dene sub-group that live along the Mackenzie River, also known as Dehcho, Deh Cho Dene (Mackenzie River People) or Dene Tha